Asgar Ali Chowdhury Jame Mosque is a mosque located at Chowdhury Para Road, Halisahar. The mosque was founded by Asgar Ali Chowdhury, who was from the elite Chowdhury family of Halishahar.

History 
Ali Asgar Chowdhury built the mosque in 1795, basing the design on Mughal architecture. By 2016, due to Size and its old  condition, it had become impossible to pray Because of Population Grow of  so Chowdhury Family Build another Mosque there,  5 million taka to fund By Chowdhury Family To repairs And Bulid new one . The repairs were done by Arbana Architect group. During these repairs, a Chowdhury family built a separate building for the displaced worshippers; the new building stands on 70 shatak of land and cost 40 million taka.

Structure 
The mosque is modelled after the Taj Mahal. The windowless structure has 24 minarets and three large tombs located on the rooftop.

New building 
The new structure's modern design, with water surrounding it, gives the illusion that it is floating on the water. The design was approved by the Jatiya Sangsad of Bangladesh.

Installation 
There is a graveyard to the south and a 100 shatak pond in front of the mosque. The new building is to the west.

Gallery

Reference 

Mosques in Chittagong